Vagen, Vågen or Vägen may refer to:

People
Arna Vågen (1905–2005), Norwegian missionary and politician
Morten Vågen (born 1975), Norwegian writer

Places
Vagen, Germany, a large village in Bavaria
Vågen, Nordland, Norway, a village
Vågen, Bergen, Norway, a bay

Other uses
Battle of Vågen, a 1665 naval battle in the Second Anglo-Dutch War

See also
Våge (disambiguation)

Norwegian-language surnames